We Danced Around the World is a 1939 German musical film directed by Karl Anton and starring Charlotte Thiele, Irene von Meyendorff, and Carola Höhn. It is a backstage musical. The film's sets were designed by Paul Markwitz and Fritz Maurischat.

Cast

References

External links

1939 musical films
German musical films
Films of Nazi Germany
Films directed by Karl Anton
Tobis Film films
German black-and-white films
1930s German films